Melody Alena Currey (December 17, 1950 – June 13, 2022) was an American politician.

Currey was born in Margaretville, New York. She went to State University of New York at Cobleskill. Currey lived in East Hartford, Connecticut, with her husband and family. Currey served in the Connecticut House of Representatives from 1993 to 2006 and was a Democrat. She then served as mayor of East Hartford from 2006 to 2010. Her son Jeffrey Currey also served in the Connecticut General Assembly.

She died on June 13, 2022, at the age of 71. She had retired from state service in 2019.

Notes

1950 births
2022 deaths
People from Delaware County, New York
People from East Hartford, Connecticut
State University of New York at Cobleskill alumni
Democratic Party members of the Connecticut House of Representatives
Women state legislators in Connecticut
Women mayors of places in Connecticut
20th-century American politicians
20th-century American women politicians
21st-century American politicians
21st-century American women politicians